18th Separate Company Armory is a historic National Guard armory building located at Glens Falls, Warren County, New York.  It is a brick and stone castle-like structure built in 1895, designed to be reminiscent of medieval military structures in Europe. It was designed by State Architect Isaac G. Perry. It is a monumental rectangular brick and stone structure covered by hipped slate roofs.  It has a large drill hall.  The building features a crenelated tower and narrow recessed windows with stone lintels.

It was added to the National Register of Historic Places in 1984.

See also
 National Register of Historic Places listings in Warren County, New York

References

Armories on the National Register of Historic Places in New York (state)
Infrastructure completed in 1895
Buildings and structures in Warren County, New York
National Register of Historic Places in Warren County, New York